Eugene Carrigan (July 5, 1906 – March 15, 1945) was a Canadian ice hockey centreman who played 37 games over three seasons in the National Hockey League for the New York Rangers, Detroit Red Wings and St. Louis Eagles. The rest of his career was spent in various minor leagues, and he retired in 1942. He was born in Edmonton, Alberta. He died of Hodgkin's disease in Fort Worth, Texas in 1945.

Career statistics

Regular season and playoffs

References

External links

1906 births
1945 deaths
Boston Cubs players
Canadian ice hockey centres
Detroit Olympics (IHL) players
Detroit Red Wings players
Fort Worth Rangers players
London Tecumsehs players
New Haven Eagles players
New York Rangers players
Portland Buckaroos players
Springfield Indians players
Ice hockey people from Edmonton
St. Paul Saints (AHA) players
St. Louis Eagles players
Victoria Cubs players
Deaths from Hodgkin lymphoma
Deaths from cancer in Texas
Canadian expatriate ice hockey players in the United States